Valentin Valentinovich Sviridov (born December 12, 1967) is a member of the LDPR and a deputy of the Russian State Duma.  He is a member of two committees of the State Duma: Defense and Accounting.

External links 
 Official web page at the Russian State Duma 

1967 births
Living people
Liberal Democratic Party of Russia politicians
Fourth convocation members of the State Duma (Russian Federation)
Sixth convocation members of the State Duma (Russian Federation)